Anne Pierre d'Harcourt was a French nobleman, notable as a duke of Harcourt and the fourth marshal of France from the House of Harcourt. He was the son of Henry d'Harcourt and great grandson of Abraham de Fabert, both marshals of France.

He married Thérèse Eulalie de Beaupoil de Saint Aulaire and had 5 children, including François-Henri d'Harcourt.

Anne
Marshals of France
18th-century peers of France